Ufimsky District (Öfö rayonı) is an administrative and municipal district (raion), one of the fifty-four in the Republic of Bashkortostan, Russia. It is located in the center of the republic and borders with Kushnarenkovsky District in the northwest and north, Blagoveshchensky District in the north, Iglinsky District in the east, Karmaskalinsky District in the south, Chishminsky District in the southwest and west, and is split into two uneven parts by the territory of the city of republic significance of Ufa. Its administrative center is the city of Ufa (which is not administratively a part of the district). As of the 2010 Census, the total population of the district was 67,067.

History
The district was established on August 20, 1930.

Administrative and municipal status
Within the framework of administrative divisions, Ufimsky District is one of the fifty-four in the republic. It is divided into nineteen selsoviets, comprising eighty-nine rural localities. The city of Ufa serves as its administrative center, despite being incorporated separately as a city of republic significance—an administrative unit with the status equal to that of the districts.

As a municipal division, the district is incorporated as Ufimsky Municipal District. Its nineteen selsoviets are incorporated as nineteen rural settlements within the municipal district.  The city of republic significance of Ufa is incorporated separately from the district as Ufa Urban Okrug, but serves as the administrative center of the municipal district as well.

References

Notes

Sources

Districts of Bashkortostan
States and territories established in 1930